The Gold Coast Vikings was a rugby league team representing the Gold Coast Rugby League Competition, where the best players of the competition get selected to play for the Vikings.

They used to compete in the Queensland State League (from 1982) and the Queensland Cup (1998) competitions. Although originally a representative team, the Vikings became a feeder club for the Gold Coast Chargers National Rugby League team, and were withdrawn from the Queensland Cup when the Chargers were withdrawn from the NRL.

Results

Amco Cup
 1978: Second Round

Queensland Cup
 1998: Semi-finalists

Queensland State League
 1995: Runners-up
 1994: Semi-finalists
 1993: Knocked out in preliminary rounds
 1992: 5th
 1991: 6th
 1988: 13th
 1987: 8th
 1986: 13th
 1985: 11th
 1984: 14th
 1983: 10th
 1982: 9th

See also

References

External links

Gold Coast Chargers
Rugby league teams on the Gold Coast, Queensland
Rugby clubs established in 1982
1982 establishments in Australia